is a historical building in Tokushima, Japan. It was designated an Important Cultural Property of Japan in 2007.

History 

In 1929, a doctor from Tokushima named Yoshiyuki Mikawa was studying abroad in Germany when he met Toyojirō Kiuchi, an architect of roughly the same age who was also from Tokushima. The two hit it off immediately and became close friends. After returning to Japan, Mikawa asked Kiuchi to design a house for him as proof of their friendship, and the result is what is now known in English as Mikawa House.

The building is notable for its German style, which was uncommon in Japan at the time. Made of reinforced concrete, it contains three floors as well as an observation tower and a wave-shaped terrace. With the Great Kantō earthquake fresh in the minds of architects at the time, Mikawa House was designed to not only be aesthetically appealing, but also physically sturdy. As an example of the evolution of modern architecture in Japan, Mikawa House was designated an Important Cultural Property on December 4, 2007. The general public is not currently allowed entrance to the building, but the city government has announced plans to finally open Mikawa House to the public by 2015.

See also 

 Cultural Properties of Japan
 Important Cultural Properties of Japan

References

External links 

 Page at the official Tokushima City website (Japanese)
 "Discovering Mikawa House" at GaijinPot

Important Cultural Properties of Japan